Kevin Alexander Vásquez Saldivia (born 27 June 1997) is a Chilean football player who plays as midfielder for Santiago Morning in Primera B de Chile.

International career
Along with Chile U20, he won the L'Alcúdia Tournament in 2015.

Honours
Chile U20
 L'Alcúdia International Tournament (1): 2015

References

External links
 

1997 births
Living people
Sportspeople from Valparaíso
Chilean footballers
Chile under-20 international footballers
Santiago Wanderers footballers
Unión La Calera footballers
Deportes Magallanes footballers
Santiago Morning footballers
Magallanes footballers
Chilean Primera División players
Primera B de Chile players
Association football midfielders